Reimar Constantin von Alvensleben (26 August 1809 – 28 March 1892) was a Prussian (and later Imperial German) general.

Born at Eichenbarleben in the Province of Saxony, Alvensleben entered the Prussian Guards from the cadet corps in 1827. He became first lieutenant in 1842, captain in 1849, and major on the Great General Staff in 1853, whence after seven years he went to the Ministry of War. He was soon afterwards promoted colonel, and commanded a regiment of Guard infantry up to 1864, when he became a major-general after the Second Schleswig War.

Alvensleben commanded a brigade of guards in the Austro-Prussian War of 1866. At the action of Soor (Burkersdorf) on 28 June, he distinguished himself greatly, and at the Battle of Königgrätz where he led the advanced guard of the Guards Corps, his energy and initiative were still more conspicuous. Soon afterwards he succeeded to the command of his division, General Wilhelm Hiller von Gärtringen having fallen in the battle; he was promoted lieutenant-general, and retained this command after the conclusion of peace, receiving in addition the order Pour le Mérite for his services.

In 1870, on the outbreak of the Franco-Prussian War, Alvensleben succeeded Prince Friedrich Karl in command of the III Army Corps, which formed part of the 2nd German army. But his questionable judgment with inconsidered attacks at Vionville-Mars-la-Tour resulted in heavy casualties. Shortly before his death in 1892 he was awarded the Order of the Black Eagle.

The Prussian Infantry Regiment Nr. 52 in Cottbus was named von Alvensleben in his honour.

Honours and awards
  Kingdom of Prussia:
 Knight of the Order of the Red Eagle, 4th Class with Swords, 1849; 1st Class with Oak Leaves, 16 June 1871
 Knight of the Order of the Prussian Crown, 2nd Class, 3 September 1863
 Pour le Mérite (military), 20 September 1866; with Oak Leaves, 31 December 1870
 Iron Cross (1870), 1st Class with 2nd Class on Black Band
 Knight of the Order of the Black Eagle, 12 January 1892
    Ernestine duchies: Commander of the Saxe-Ernestine House Order, 1st Class, April 1859
 : Knight of the Order of St. George, 3rd Class, 27 December 1870

See also
 House of Alvensleben

References

1809 births
1892 deaths
People from Börde (district)
People from the Province of Saxony
Constantin
Generals of Infantry (Prussia)
Prussian people of the Austro-Prussian War
German military personnel of the Franco-Prussian War
Recipients of the Pour le Mérite (military class)
Recipients of the Iron Cross (1870), 1st class
Recipients of the Order of St. George of the Third Degree
Military personnel from Saxony-Anhalt